20936 Nemrut Dagi, provisional designation: , is a stony Hungaria asteroid and Mars-grazer from the innermost regions of the asteroid belt, approximately  in diameter. It was discovered on 13 May 1971, by Dutch astronomer couple Ingrid and Cornelis van Houten at Leiden, on photographic plates taken by Dutch–American astronomer Tom Gehrels at Palomar Observatory in California, United States. The asteroid has a rotation period of 3.28 hours, a likely spheroidal shape, and a high albedo typically seen among the enstatite-rich E-type asteroids. In 2012, it was named after the a dormant volcano Nemrut (Nemrut Dağı) in Turkey.

Orbit and classification 

Nemrut Dagi belongs to the dynamical group of Hungaria asteroids, which form the innermost dense concentration of asteroids in the Solar System. It orbits the Sun in the inner main-belt at a distance of 1.7–2.0 AU once every 2 years and 6 months (922 days; semi-major axis of 1.85 AU). Its orbit has an eccentricity of 0.10 and an inclination of 19° with respect to the ecliptic. Nemrut Dagi is also an outer Mars-grazer, as its orbit has a perihelion (1.667 AU) slightly below the aphelion of Mars (1.67 AU), not crossing the Red Plant's osculating orbit. It is classified as an "inner main-belt asteroid" in the JPL's data base, where it would be labelled a Mars-crosser if it had a perihelion of 1.666 AU or less.

Designation

Survey designation 

Upon discovery, this minor planet was designated . The survey designation means that it was the 4835th object discovered in the "T-1" series, which stands for the first Palomar–Leiden Trojan survey, named after the fruitful collaboration of the Palomar and Leiden Observatory in the 1960s and 1970s. Gehrels used Palomar's Samuel Oschin telescope (also known as the 48-inch Schmidt Telescope), and shipped the photographic plates to Ingrid and Cornelis van Houten at Leiden Observatory where astrometry was carried out. The trio are credited with several thousand asteroid discoveries.

Naming 

It was named after the a dormant volcano Nemrut (Nemrut Dağı) in Turkey. It is the most western volcano of a group of volcanoes near Lake Van in Eastern Anatolia. The volcano is named after King Nimrod who is said to have ruled this area in about 2100 BC. The asteroid's name was proposed by German astronomer Joachim Schubart, and its official  was published by the Minor Planet Center on 6 April 2012.

Physical characteristics

Lightcurves 

In December 2015, a rotational lightcurve of Nemrut Dagi was obtained by American astronomer Brian Warner at his CS3–Palmer Divide Station  in California. Lightcurve analysis gave a well-defined rotation period of  hours with a low brightness variation of  magnitude, indicating that the body has a rather spheroidal shape.

This result supersedes previous observations.

Diameter and albedo 

A high albedo of 0.30 or more is typically seen among the bright E-type asteroids that are thought to be composed of enstatite, a mineral which is rich in Magnesium sulfite (MgS03). The Collaborative Asteroid Lightcurve Link assumed a standard albedo for a common S-type asteroid of 0.20, and calculates a larger diameter of 5.3 kilometers based on an absolute magnitude of 13.8.

Notes

References

External links 
  
 Asteroid Lightcurve Database (LCDB), query form (info )
 Dictionary of Minor Planet Names, Google books
 Discovery Circumstances: Numbered Minor Planets (20001)-(25000) – Minor Planet Center
 
 

020936
4835
Discoveries by Tom Gehrels
Discoveries by Cornelis Johannes van Houten
Discoveries by Ingrid van Houten-Groeneveld
Named minor planets
19710513